The Paluxy Formation is a geological formation found in Texas, Louisiana, Arkansas, Mississippi and Oklahoma, whose strata date back to the Early Cretaceous. Dinosaur remains are among the fossils that have been recovered from the formation.

Vertebrate paleofauna
 Coelurosauria indet.
 Cedarosaurus weiskopfae
 Astrophocaudia slaughteri
 Nodosauridae indet.
 Tenontosaurus cf. tilletti

See also

 List of dinosaur-bearing rock formations

References

Cretaceous geology of Oklahoma
Cretaceous geology of Texas
Albian Stage
Carboniferous southern paleotropical deposits